"Tell Me Why" is a song by British eclectic soul group The Wah Wah Collective. The original version was a vinyl only release in March 2004 on the Greasy Geezers label. A new remastered radio edit version of the song was circulated in late 2013 by I-innovate (UK) to support The Wah Wah Collective debut album Cry Baby Soul released 24 February 2014.  To accompany the release of Cry Baby Soul, re-issued 12" vinyl versions of "Tell Me Why" were redistributed. The album Cry Baby Soul features the full length version.

Background
Tell Me Why features Birmingham (UK) based soul, jazz vocalist Fiona Faye and was recorded within several Wah Wah jamming sessions in the early formation period of The Wah Wah Collective.  Produced by Georgeyo with 'The Elusive' Najero Okenabirhie as Executive Producer.

Critical reception
The 2013/14 version of Tell Me Why received a positive reception and extensive airplay on many specialist radio stations catering to the soul and funk genre throughout Europe, US and other countries. This prompted radio features and interviews for The Wah Wah Collective.

On magazine album reviews for Cry Baby Soul the song 'Tell Me Why' was highlighted as one of the most popular songs by The Wah Wah Collective.

Track listing

12" Vinyl Release

2013 Digital Version

Personnel

 Featured Artist: Fiona Faye (Fiona Spence-Reid)
 Software Programming: George Eyo, Najero Okenabirhie
 Keyboards: George Eyo
 Background vocals: George Eyo, Najero Okenabirhie
 Song Arrangement: George Eyo, Mel Glynn 
 Executive Producer: Najero Okenabirhie

References

External links 
 MTV Artists Profile: The Wah Wah Collective
 Motor City & Funk Radio: Soul Chart
  OneLuvFM (France) Featured Artists
 The Wah Wah Collective Discog's Page
  Sound Fusion Radio (UK) Featured Artists
 BBC Music - The Wah Wah Collective
  The Wah Wah Collective on Rootdown FM (US)

2013 singles
British soul songs
2004 songs
Nu jazz songs
Neo soul songs